The High Plains Reader is an alternative newspaper serving the Fargo metropolitan area, with an estimated readership of 20,000 to 30,000 weekly between print and online readers. The tabloid was founded in 1994 by Ian Swanson, Peter Ryan, and Len Schmid in Grand Forks, North Dakota and is currently owned by Raul Gomez and John Strand who purchased the paper in late December 1996. After a flood and fire destroyed their Grand Forks office, the Reader moved its office to Fargo.  In 2004, the Reader celebrated its 10th anniversary in different venues in the Fargo-Moorhead area, including Ralph's Corner Bar.  Distribution ended in the Grand Forks area in 2009. In 2014, HPR celebrated 20 years.

Features
The paper features reviews of bands, movies, and theater in Fargo-Moorhead, plus a calendar of weekly events.  Its editorials generally take a more leftist tack than those of The Forum of Fargo-Moorhead.

Recurring portions of the High Plains Reader include the weekly editorial, written by Editor Sabrina Hornung, photojournalist and news editor C.S. Christopher Hagen, or Co-owner John Strand; the cover story; features; opinion; wellness; a theater column; movie reviews by Greg Carlson; a Best Bets section, generally giving brief synopses of upcoming events, focusing mostly on local musicians; and a calendar section, a detailed list of daily events for the upcoming week.

Controversy
The Reader began carrying Allison Moorhead's sex column in late 2004, which had a controversial and short run at North Dakota State University's newspaper The Spectrum.  Longtime HPR contributor Ed Raymond withdrew his "The Gadfly" column in protest.

The column offered general information about sexual activities, including accounts of the writer's own, rather than a question-and-answer format.  Moorhead stopped writing for the Reader in early 2005.  Ed Raymond returned to writing his column the following June.

External links

Alternative weekly newspapers published in the United States
Newspapers published in North Dakota
Fargo–Moorhead
Greater Grand Forks
Publications established in 1994
1994 establishments in North Dakota